"Galway Bay" is the name of at least two different songs.

The first, "(My Own Dear) Galway Bay", is traditionally more popular and known in the Galway Bay area. The second song is more popular outside Ireland.

"(My Own Dear) Galway Bay"
This song is known alternatively as "Galway Bay", "My Own Dear Galway Bay", or "The Old Galway Bay".

It was composed in London by Frank A. Fahy (1854–1935), a native of Kinvara, Co. Galway, on the shores of Galway Bay. It was originally written to air of "Skibbereen".

One of the most renowned recordings of the later version was by the Irish singer Dolores Keane.

"Galway Bay"
A separate song was written by Dr. Arthur Colahan in Leicester in 1947 and popularised by Bing Crosby. Crosby recorded the song with Victor Young and his Orchestra on 27 November 1947, and changed some of the lyrics so as to be less political. It became a huge hit around the world with Irish emigrants, and reached the No. 3 position in the Billboard charts in the U.S. Crosby recorded the song again in 1966 for a television show broadcast the following year. The tracks were recorded in Dublin, and later commercially issued on the album A Little Bit of Irish. Crosby also included the song in his 50th anniversary concert at the London Palladium, which was recorded and issued on a double album. In 1948, "Galway Bay" spent 22 consecutive weeks at No. 1 on the UK's sheet music sales chart, with multiple cover versions available at the time. Unusually, it entered the chart at No. 1, and spent a total of 39 weeks on the listings. The contemporary recordings available during this period were by:

 Denis Martin
 Robert Wilson
 Bing Crosby
 The Sentimentalists presented by Billy Cotton
 Anne Shelton with The Wardour Singers
 Bill Johnson
 Jack Simpson and his Sextet (vocal by Dave Kydd)
 Michael O'Duffy with Duncan Morrison (piano)
 Joseph McNally
 Josef Locke
 Joe Loss and his Orchestra (vocal by The Lhon D'Hoo Male Choir)

Ruby Murray later included the song on her album When Irish Eyes Are Smiling (1955).

The copyright of "Galway Bay" is held by Box and Cox Publications of London. A humorous version was created by The Clancy Brothers and Tommy Makem. A notable reference to Colahan's song is made in The Pogues' "Fairytale of New York". Chloë Agnew of Celtic Woman also covered the song in the group's show Songs from the Heart, while Philip Noone released a more modern version as a single in 2019.

References

1947 songs
Irish folk songs
Music in Galway (city)
Songs about Ireland